Isaac Thompson (born 2 July 1987) is a New Zealand rugby union player. His position of choice is fly-half. He made his debut for the Brumbies in Super Rugby during the 2017 season. 

Thompson was educated at Palmerston North Boys' High School and signed for the Manawatu Turbos in 2008 where he totaled 30 games in the National Provincial Championship, scoring 134 points. 

His younger brother, Rob, currently plays for the Highlanders in Super Rugby.

References 

New Zealand rugby union players
Rugby union fly-halves
Manawatu rugby union players
Living people
ACT Brumbies players
Canberra Vikings players
1987 births
Rugby union players from Palmerston North